Icefall Peak is a  mountain summit located in the Canadian Rockies of British Columbia, Canada. Icefall Peak is situated on the Bush Mountain massif, and the nearest higher neighbor is Rostrum Peak,  to the south-southeast. The peak was named in 1918 by the Interprovincial Boundary Survey for an icefall on its eastern flank, and was officially adopted in 1924 when approved by the Geographical Names Board of Canada.  The first ascent of the mountain was made in 1954 by S.B. Hendricks, D. Hubbard, Dr. and Mrs. E.K. Karcher, and A.E. Peterson.

Geology
Icefall Peak is composed of sedimentary rock laid down during the Precambrian to Jurassic periods. Formed in shallow seas, this sedimentary rock was pushed east and over the top of younger rock during the Laramide orogeny.

Climate
Based on the Köppen climate classification, Icefall Peak is located in a subarctic climate zone with cold, snowy winters, and mild summers. Winter temperatures can drop below −20 °C with wind chill factors below −30 °C.

See also
Geography of British Columbia

References

External links
 Weather: Icefall Peak

Three-thousanders of British Columbia
Canadian Rockies
Kootenay Land District